Nieznajowa  (Neznayova, Neznayeva) is a depopulated village in the administrative district of Gmina Sękowa, within Gorlice County, Lesser Poland Voivodeship, in southern Poland, close to the border with Slovakia.

The village was populated predominantly by Lemkos, who were deported to Ukraine in 1945-47 during common Soviet-Polish Operation Vistula. In the village remain Lemko cemetery, some roadside crosses and figures, some ruins of old buildings.

Gallery

References

Nieznajowa